Jaba’ is a Palestinian town in the Jerusalem Governorate of the State of Palestine, located northeast of Jerusalem in the central West Bank. According to the Palestinian Central Bureau of Statistics, the town had a population of 3,239 in 2006.

Location
It is bordered by Mikhmas and 'Anata to the east, Mikhmas to the north, Ar Ram to the west, and Geva Binyamin, Hizma and 'Anata to the south.

Toponymy 

History
Jaba' is securely identified with the ancient Geba of the tribe of Benjamin. Guérin and Conder & Kitchener of the PEF were the first to suggest that identification during the 19th century. The identification is based on the biblical description of Geba as being just across the wadi from Michmash (present-day Mukhmas), and on archeological findings which show that the site was heavily populated during the Iron Age II and the Hellenistic period.

Ceramics from the Byzantine era have been also found in Jaba'.

Ottoman era
In 1517, the village was included in the Ottoman empire with the rest of Palestine, and in the 1596 tax-records it appeared as [Jaba] al-Battih,   located in the Nahiya of Quds of the Liwa of Al-Quds. The population was 51 households, all Muslim. They paid a  fixed  tax rate of 33.3% on agricultural products, such as wheat, barley, olive trees, fruit trees, goats and beehives, in addition to occasional revenues; a total of 9,442 akçe. 1/6 of the revenue went to a Muslim charitable endowment.

In 1838, it was a Muslim village, located in the area immediately north of Jerusalem. That year Robinson further noted it as a small village, and half in ruins. There were occasional large hewn stones, indicating antiquity. He also noted a small building, having the appearance of an ancient church, and a square tower. Robinson thought Jaba' was ancient Gibeah but most scholars today identify it with Tell el-Ful. 

In 1863 Guérin noted: "Thirty of the houses only are standing. On the highest point of the plateau on which they are placed is a little fort or Burj, the lower courses of which, if they are not ancient, are at least built of ancient stones. Here and there cisterns and caves cut in the rock show the antiquity of the place. There is also an old wall of great square stones, only a few vestiges of which remain." An Ottoman village list from about 1870  found that the village had a population of 100, in a total of 35 houses, though the population count included only men.  

In 1883, the PEF's Survey of Western Palestine (SWP) described it as "A village of moderate size standing on a rocky knoll. On the north is a deep valley (Wady Suweinit); on the south the ground falls less abruptly, but is very rocky; on the west the ridge is flat; and on the east is a plain extending for about 1 1/2 miles, and about 1/2 mile wide north and south. This plain is open arable land, extending to the brink of the precipitous cliffs on the north. The village has caves beneath, at the foot of the knoll [...] and there are olives on the west, north, and south. There is a central high house like a tower in the village.

They further noted: "There is a large cave beneath the village on the east, about 20 to 30 paces square, with a passage on the left at the back, extending 15 paces. This is partly cut, partly natural, with a double entrance. A second like it is said to exist nearer the village. West of the village, by the old road, are cisterns, rock-cut, and in one case roofed with a rubble tunnel-vault."

In 1896 the population of Dscheba was estimated to be about 204 persons.

British Mandate  era
In the  1922 census of Palestine conducted by the British Mandate authorities, Juba had a population of  229, all Muslims, increasing in  the 1931 census to 286 Muslim inhabitants, in 53 inhabited houses.

In the 1945 statistics Jaba had a population of 350 Muslims with 13,407 dunams of land, according to an official land and population survey. Of this, 282 dunams were plantations and irrigable land, 3,794 used for cereals, while 24 dunams were built-up (urban) land.

Jordanian era
In the wake of the 1948 Arab–Israeli War, and after the 1949 Armistice Agreements, Jaba' came under Jordanian rule.

The Jordanian census of 1961 found 415 inhabitants in Jaba'.

Post-1967
After the Six-Day War in 1967, Jaba' came under Israeli occupation. The population in the 1967 census conducted by the Israeli authorities was 546, 8 of whom originated from the Israeli territory. 

After the 1995 accords, about 5% of the village land was classified as Area B, the remaining 95% as Area C. Israel has confiscated village land for the construction of two Israeli settlements:  1,139 dunums for Giva’ Ben Yamin, 545 dunums for Shi’ar BenYamin, as well as for a military checkpoint, with additional land requisitioned for the Israeli West Bank barrier.

Footnotes

Bibliography

External links
  Welcome To Jaba'
Jaba’, Welcome to Palestine
Survey of Western Palestine, Map 17:    IAA, Wikimedia commons
 Jaba' Village (Fact Sheet), Applied Research Institute–Jerusalem (ARIJ)
 Jaba' Village Profile, ARIJ
 Jaba, aerial photo, ARIJ
 Locality Development Priorities and Needs in Jaba', ARIJ

Villages in the West Bank
Jerusalem Governorate
Municipalities of the State of Palestine